The Women's 10 metre air pistol event took place on 25 July 2014 at the Barry Buddon Shooting Centre. There was a qualification in which the top 8 athletes qualified for the finals. In the finals, each athlete shot 3 times. The latter was eliminated. After that, each athlete once and threw the athlete lowest score was eliminated by the winners.

Results

Preliminares

Final

References

External links
Schedule

Shooting at the 2014 Commonwealth Games
Common